Area codes 843 and 854 are telephone area codes in the North American Numbering Plan (NANP) for that portion of the U.S. state of South Carolina comprising roughly the eastern third and the southern tip. The numbering plan area (NPA) includes the Grand Strand, the Lowcountry, the Pee Dee, and the Sandhills. Major cities in the region are Myrtle Beach, Charleston, Beaufort, Hilton Head Island and Florence. Area code 843 was created in 1998 when area code 803 was split, while 854 was added in 2015 to form an all-services overlay.

History
Area code 843 entered service on March 22, 1998, created in a split of area code 803. In 2013, the NANP Administrator determined that 843 would run out of central office prefixes in 2015.  In addition to the rapid growth of the Grand Strand, Charleston and Beaufort/Hilton Head areas, most of the southern portion of the numbering plan area is part of the Savannah, Georgia LATA.

On December 9, 2013, it was decided that the 843 territory would receive the state's first all-service overlay. On December 16, 2013, the new area code of 854, approved by the South Carolina Public Service Commission, was announced. 854 entered service on March 14, 2015. Permissive dialing continued until September 18, 2015, during which both seven- and ten-digit dialing were supported. On September 19, 2015, ten-digit dialing became mandatory in the 843/854 territory. The first new 854 numbers were issued sometime in the fall of 2015.

Service area

Counties

Florence
Darlington
Horry
Marion
Dillon
Marlboro
Chesterfield
Berkeley
Charleston
Georgetown
Williamsburg
Colleton
Jasper
Beaufort

Major communities
Major cities within the area code are in bold.

Andrews
Atlantic Beach
Aynor
Awendaw
Beaufort
Bennettsville
Bethune
Blenheim
Bluffton
Briarcliffe Acres
Carolina Forest
Charleston
Conway
Darlington
Dillon
Edisto Beach
Florence
Folly Beach
Garden City Beach
Georgetown
Goose Creek
Hanahan
Hardeeville
Hartsville
Hemingway
Hilton Head Island
Isle of Palms
Jamestown
Johns Island
Johnsonville
Kingstree
Ladson
Lake City
Lake View
Lamar
Latta
Little River
Loris
Longs
Marion
McBee
McClellanville
McColl
Moncks Corner
Mt. Pleasant
Mullins
Murrells Inlet
Myrtle Beach
Nesmith
Nichols
North Charleston
North Hartsville
North Myrtle Beach
Okatie
Pageland
Pawleys Island
Port Royal
Quinby
Red Hill
Ridgeland
Socastee
Society Hill
St. Stephen
Stuckey
Sullivans Island
Summerville
Surfside Beach
Timmonsville
Turbeville
Wallace
Walterboro

References

External links

List of exchanges from AreaCodeDownload.com, 843 Area Code

843
843
Telecommunications-related introductions in 1988